Morinish is a rural locality in the Rockhampton Region, Queensland, Australia. In the  Morinish had a population of 89 people.

Geography
The locality is bounded by the Fitzroy River to the north and west. 

Ten Mile Creek rises in the south-west of the locality and flows northward through the locality where it becomes a tributary of the Fitzroy River.

The former town of Morinish is south of centre of the locality (approx ).

History
Gold was found at Morinish in 1866 with miners working in the area by December 1866, and a "new rush" being described in the newspapers in February 1867 with the population being estimated on the field as 600.

The Morinish Post Office opened on 1 July 1867 and closed on 4 November 1872.

There were at least three major mines in the period of 1880s to 1900s: Welcome Reef, Alliance Mine and Mount Morinish Mine.

Perhaps reflecting the changing fortunes on the goldfields, schooling in Morinish was available intermittently.

Morinish Provisional School opened circa 1882 and closed circa 1890. A second Morinish Provisional School opened circa 1894 and closed circa 1897, but it is not known if this was first school re-opening or a different school.

In 1902 two new provisional schools opened called Morinish No 1 Provisional School and Morinish No 2 Provisional School. They were half-time schools (meaning they shared a single teacher between them). In 1915 the No 2 school was closed and the No 1 school became the full-time  Morinish State School. It closed in 1928. In 1930 the school building was relocated to establish Garnant State School.

Ten Mile Creek Provisional School opened in 1916 but closed circa 1917.

Morinish was within the Shire of Fitzroy until 2008 when amalgamation of local government areas resulted in it becoming part of the newly created Rockhampton Region.

In the  Morinish had a population of 89 people.

Notable residents
 Fergus McMaster, one of the founders of the airline Qantas, was born in Morinish

References

Further reading

 

Suburbs of Rockhampton Region
Localities in Queensland